Christian Benjamin Oxlade-Chamberlain (born 24 June 1998) is an English professional footballer who plays as a defender for King's Lynn Town.

Club career

Portsmouth
Born in Portsmouth, Oxlade-Chamberlain progressed through Portsmouth's youth categories. He signed a two-year scholarship contract on 4 July 2014.

Oxlade-Chamberlain made his professional debut on 1 September 2015, coming on as a substitute for Adam McGurk in a 0–2 Football League Trophy away defeat against Exeter City. He spent the rest of the year in the Academy finishing the season with 30 appearances and 3 goals. In January 2016, he was loaned for a month to Wimborne Town in the Southern Football League Division One South & West.

On 25 April 2016, Oxlade-Chamberlain was offered a one-year professional contract with academy manager Mark Kelly stating "Christian's a bit of a late developer, as he's younger than the rest of the lads in that age group. He's come on a lot this year and is developing physically – he's a powerful lad and we're seeing more consistent displays from him."

In August 2016 he was loaned in by Steve Claridge, manager of Salisbury, again in the eighth tier. Two months later he was loaned to Eastbourne Borough in the National League South, who extended his services to the end of the season.

Poole Town, also of the sixth tier, brought in Oxlade-Chamberlain and Pompey teammate Jez Bedford for a month in August 2017. Later that season, he had two loan spells at Oxford City in the same league, both being curtailed by injury crises at his parent club, though he did not make any further appearances for them.

Notts County
On 18 July 2018, Oxlade-Chamberlain completed a transfer to League Two club Notts County, signing a two-year contract, with effect from 1 August. He made his debut on 4 September in an EFL Trophy 2–1 loss at Grimsby Town, playing the full 90 minutes in Harry Kewell's first match as manager. Four days later he played for the first time in a professional league in a 5–1 loss at Exeter City, in which he gave away a penalty for handball. He did not play again until New Year's Day when he came on at half time for Matt Tootle at Oldham Athletic and was sent off at the end of a 2–0 loss.

After the Magipies' relegation to the National League, Oxlade-Chamberlain played only the season opening 1–0 loss to Eastleigh before leaving for Ilkeston Town of the Northern Premier League Division One South East on a month's loan on 29 November 2019. He was released by the Magpies in June 2020.

On 19 September 2020, he joined Gosport Borough of the Southern Football League.

Oxlade-Chamberlain signed for National League side, Aldershot Town on 11 August 2021. 

On 4 November 2022, King's Lynn Town announced they had signed Oxlade-Chamberlain after he had left Aldershot Town on 1 July 2022. He made his first appearance for the club in a 1–0 FA Cup win against League Two side Doncaster Rovers, being subbed on in the 82nd minute.

Personal life
Oxlade-Chamberlain's paternal grandparents emigrated to England from Jamaica. His elder brother, Alex, is also a footballer who plays for Liverpool and has represented England at international level. Their father Mark represented Portsmouth and England in the 1980s and 1990s, while their uncle Neville was also a professional footballer.

Career statistics

References

External links

1998 births
Living people
Footballers from Portsmouth
English footballers
Association football midfielders
Portsmouth F.C. players
Notts County F.C. players
Wimborne Town F.C. players
Salisbury F.C. players
Eastbourne Borough F.C. players
Poole Town F.C. players
Oxford City F.C. players
Gosport Borough F.C. players
Ilkeston Town F.C. players
Aldershot Town F.C. players
Southern Football League players
National League (English football) players
English Football League players
English people of Jamaican descent
Black British sportsmen